The National Entertainment Collectibles Association (mostly known by its acronym NECA) is an American manufacturer of collectibles typically licensed from films, video-games, sports, music, and television based in New Jersey. The company was founded in 1996 and has over 60 licenses for which it produces products.

In 2002, "NECA's Reel Toys" was formed as a division to produce toys, action figures and dolls that are targeted towards action figure and toy enthusiasts. They are intended for teens and adults as collectibles for many licenses that no other company would market as a toy.

On September 14, 2009, they announced acquisition of the WizKids assets from Topps, for the collectible miniature Clix games and Pocketmodel games.

NECA Licenses (current and past)

"Weird Al" Yankovic
 9
 300
 A Christmas Story
 AC/DC
 Ace Ventura: Pet Detective
 Adventure Time
 Alien
 Aliens
 Alien 3 
 Alien 3 (NES game)
 Alien: Covenant
 Alien: Isolation
 Aliens: Fireteam Elite
 Alien Resurrection
 Alien vs. Predator (2004)
 Aliens vs. Predator: Requiem
 Alien vs. Predator (arcade game)
 A Nightmare on Elm Street (1984)
 A Nightmare on Elm Street (NES game)
 A Nightmare on Elm Street 2: Freddy's Revenge 
 A Nightmare on Elm Street 3: Dream Warriors 
 A Nightmare on Elm Street 4: The Dream Master 
 A Nightmare on Elm Street 5: The Dream Child 
 A Nightmare on Elm Street (2010)
 An American Werewolf in London
 American Gods
 American Psycho
 Army of Darkness
 Army of Two
 Arrow
 Ash vs Evil Dead
 Assassin's Creed
 Assassin's Creed II
Assassin's Creed: Brotherhood
Assassin's Creed: Revelations
 The Avengers
 Avengers: Age of Ultron
 Avengers: Infinity War
 Back to the Future
 Back to the Future Part II
 Back to the Future Part III
 Batman (1966 TV series)
 Batman (1989)
 Batman (NES game)
 Batman: Arkham City
 Batman Begins
 Batman Returns
 Batman v Superman: Dawn of Justice
 The Joker (The Dark Knight)
 Beetlejuice
 Bill & Ted
 BioShock 2
 BioShock Infinite
 Blade Runner 2049
 Bob Marley
 Bob Ross
 The Boondock Saints
 Borderlands
 The Boys (TV series)
 Bride of Chucky
 Bubba Ho-Tep
 Bulletstorm
Candyman: Farewell to the Flesh
 Captain America: Civil War
 Carrie
 Castlevania
 Charmed
 Chia Pet
 Child's Play
 Child's Play 2
 Child's Play 3
 The Chronicles of Narnia
 Clash of the Titans (2010)
 Commando (1985)
 Conan the Barbarian (1982)
 Contra
 Coraline
 Crash Bandicoot
 Creature from the Black Lagoon
 Creed
 Creed II
 Creepshow
 Cult of Chucky
 Curse of Chucky
 The Crow
 DC Comics
 Dante's Inferno
 Daredevil
 The Dark Crystal
 The Dark Knight
 The Dark Knight Rises
 Dawn of the Dead (1978)
 Dawn of the Planet of the Apes
 Deadpool
 Dead Space (franchise)
 Death Proof
 The Devil's Backbone
 Devil May Cry
 The Devil's Rejects 
 Devo
 Die Hard
 Divergent
 Django Unchained
 Doctor Strange
 Donnie Darko
 Dota 2
 Dracula (1931)
 Duke Nukem Forever
 E.T. the Extra-Terrestrial
 Escape from New York
 Elf
 Elvira
 Elvis Presley
 The Evil Dead
 Evil Dead II
 The Exorcist
 First Blood
 Five Nights at Freddy's
 The Fog
 Frankenstein (1931)
 Freddie Mercury
 Freddy's Dead: The Final Nightmare
 Freddy vs. Jason (2003)
 Friday the 13th (1980)
 Friday the 13th (NES video game)
 Friday the 13th Part II
 Friday the 13th Part III
 Friday the 13th: The Final Chapter 
 Friday the 13th: A New Beginning 
 Friday the 13th Part VI: Jason Lives 
 Friday the 13th Part VII: The New Blood 
 Friday the 13th Part VIII: Jason Takes Manhattan
 Friday the 13th (2009)
 Gargoyles
 Ghostbusters
 Ghostbusters II
 Gears of War
 Gears of War 2
 Gears of War 3
 Godzilla: King of the Monsters (2019 film)
 God of War (2005)
 God of War II
 God of War III
 God of War (2018)
 The Golden Girls
 Green Day
 Gremlins
 Gremlins 2: The New Batch
 Grindhouse
 Guardians of the Galaxy
 Guardians of the Galaxy Vol. 2
 Half-Life 2
 Halo
 Halloween (1978)
 Halloween II (1981)
 Halloween III: Season of the Witch
 Halloween (2007)
 Halloween (2018)
 Halloween Kills
 Harry Potter
 The Hateful Eight
 Hatchet
 Hellraiser
 Heroes of the Storm
 Highlander
 The Hitchhiker's Guide to the Galaxy
 Home Alone
 House of 1000 Corpses
 The Hobbit
 Hulk
 The Hunger Games
 The Hunger Games: Catching Fire
 Iggy Pop
 Insane Clown Posse
 Interstellar
 It (1990)
 It (2017)
 Iron Maiden
 Iron Man 3
 Jason Goes to Hell: The Final Friday
 Jason X
 Jaws
 Jeff Dunham
 Jimmy Page
 John Lennon 
 Johnny Ramone
 Joey Ramone
 Jonah Hex
 Justice League
 The Karate Kid
 Kick-Ass 2
 Kill Bill
 Kill Bill 2
 King Features Syndicate
 King Kong
 Kurt Cobain
 Labyrinth
 Leatherface: The Texas Chainsaw Massacre III
 Left 4 Dead
 Left 4 Dead 2
 LittleBigPlanet
 The Lone Ranger (2013)
 The Lord of the Rings
 The Lost Boys
 Machete
 Machete Kills
 Man of Steel
 Masters of the Universe
 Marvel Comics
 Men in Black II
 Misfits
 Mothra vs. Godzilla
 Muhammad Ali
 My Bloody Valentine
 National Lampoon's Christmas Vacation
 Night of the Demons
 The Nightmare Before Christmas
 Ninja Gaiden II
 Overwatch
 Pacific Rim
 Pan's Labyrinth
 Pee-wee's Playhouse
 Pirates of the Caribbean
 Phantasm
 Planet of the Apes
 Planet Terror
 Portal 2 
 Preacher
 Predator
 Predator (NES game)
 Predator 2
 Predators
 The Predator 
 The Princess Bride
 Prototype
 Prometheus
 Pulp Fiction
 Puppet Master
 Quentin Tarantino
 Rambo: First Blood Part II
 Rambo (NES game)
 Re-Animator
 Reservoir Dogs
 Resident Evil
 Resident Evil 4
 Resident Evil 5
 The Return of Godzilla
 Robert Rodriguez
 RoboCop
 RoboCop (NES game)
 RoboCop 3
 RoboCop Vs The Terminator
 RoboCop Vs Terminator
 Rocky
 Rocky (NES game)
 Rocky II
 Rocky III
 Rocky IV
 The Rocky Horror Picture Show
 Scarface
 Saw
 Scream 4
 Seed of Chucky
 The Shape of Water
 Shaun of the Dead
 Shin Godzilla
 The Silence of the Lambs
 Silent Night, Deadly Night
 The Simpsons
 Sin City (film)
 Spider-Man: Homecoming
 Splinter Cell: Conviction
 Star Trek
 Street Fighter
 Street Fighter IV
 Suicide Squad
 Superman: The Movie
 Sweeney Todd: The Demon Barber of Fleet Street (2007 film)
 Team Fortress 2
 Teenage Mutant Ninja Turtles
 The Terminator
 Terminator 2: Judgment Day
 Terminator 2: Judgment Day (NES game)
 Terminator 3: Rise of the Machines
 Terminator: Dark Fate
 Terminator Genisys
 Terminator Salvation
 The Texas Chain Saw Massacre
 The Texas Chain Saw Massacre (Atari game)
 The Texas Chainsaw Massacre 2
 The Texas Chainsaw Massacre (2003)
 The Texas Chainsaw Massacre: The Beginning
 The Thing
 They Live
 Thor: The Dark World
 Tomb Raider (franchise)
 Trick 'r Treat
 Twilight
 The Twilight Saga: Eclipse
 The Twilight Saga: New Moon
 Uncharted 4: A Thief's End
 Universal Classic Monsters
 Up in Smoke
 Usagi Yojimbo
 V for Vendetta
 Valerian and the City of a Thousand Planets
 Venom
 The Walking Dead
 Watchmen
 Wes Craven's New Nightmare
 The Wolf Man (1941)
 Wonder Woman
 The Year Without a Santa Claus
 Yu-Gi-Oh!

See also
 Good Smile Company
 Star Wars: The Black Series
 Bandai

References

External links
 

Toy companies of the United States
Toy companies established in 1996
Companies based in Union County, New Jersey